CRUISR (pronounced cruiser) is an American indie pop band based in Philadelphia. They are signed to Vagrant Records. The line-up consists of Andy States (Vocals, Guitar), Jon Van Dine (Drums), and Bruno Catrambone (Guitar).

Background 
CRUISR's beginnings date back to 2012 as a solo project of lead singer, Andy States. States wrote and recorded the band's first EP in his Philadelphia bedroom, fixated on the idea of what it means to craft a pop song.

"I have an obsession with writing pop music and the idea that songs can transcend people," States says. "I saw that producer Jeremy Park started writing blog articles about how he recorded Youth Lagoon, so I wrote to him and sent him my songs asking for advice and knowledge. He wrote back and loved my stuff and helped me produce the first EP."

The "Cruiser EP" garnered attention on various blogs and led to the expansion of the band.

2014 
In 2014, the band released their debut single, "All Over", working with producer Andrew Maury (RAC, Panama Wedding, Ra Ra Riot). They also landed spots at Budweiser Made in America Festival, as well as Firefly Music Festival and a full North American tour with The 1975.

2015 
In 2015, the band performed at Hangout Fest, various dates with Bleachers and Joywave, opened for Imagine Dragons in Philadelphia  and once again at Firefly Music Festival. They toured in July and August with Young Rising Sons and Hunter Hunted beginning on July 25 in Salt Lake City, Utah.

2016 
On May 4, bassist Kyle Cook departed from the band to focus on his graphic design career. They announced this via the band's Facebook account.

On July 17, they released a brand new 2-track single titled "Throw Shade", which also includes a b-side, "Moving to Neptune".

Starting May 11, CRUISR supported PVRIS on a full U.S. tour along with Lydia.

On Nov 19, CRUISR supported AGAINST THE CURRENT on their "In Our Bones" North America tour.

2018 
In March and April, CRUISR supported Matt & Kim on the first leg of their North American tour.

On April 19, CRUISR released their first single since 2016 titled 'Mind Eraser', which was featured on Spotify's New Music Friday playlist.

Band members

Current members
 Andy States — lead vocals, rhythm guitar (2012–present)
 Jon Van Dine — drums (2012–present)
 Bruno Catrambone — lead guitar, keyboards (2014–present)

Touring members
 Wesley Bunch — bass guitar (2016)
 Paul Impellizeri — bass guitar (2016–2017)
 Peter Pantina — bass guitar

Former members
 — bass guitar (2012–16)

Discography

Albums 
 CRUISR (2015)

EPs 
 Cruiser (2012)
 "All Over" (2014)

Singles 
 "Go For It" (2015)
 "Throw Shade" (2015)
 "Take That" (2016)
 "Mind Eraser" (2018)
 "Opening Up" (2019)
 "Get Out" (2019)

References

External links 
 Official Website
 Vagrant Profile 

Musical groups established in 2012
Musical groups from Philadelphia
Indie pop groups from Pennsylvania
2012 establishments in Pennsylvania